The 2011 Copa Colombia, officially the 2011 Copa Postobón for sponsorship reasons, was the ninth edition of the Copa Colombia, the national cup competition for clubs of DIMAYOR. It began on February 23 and ended on October 27. The winner earned a berth to the 2012 Copa Sudamericana.

Format
The tournament comprises a total of 36 teams, divided into six groups based on each separate region of Colombia. The group winners and runners-up advance to the Round of 16, along with the four best third-placed teams.

Phase I

Group A 
Comprises teams from the Caribbean and Atlantic regions.

Group B 
Comprises teams from the Paisa region.

Group C 
Comprises teams from the Santander region.

Group D 
Comprises teams from the capital district of Bogotá.

Group E 
Comprises teams from the Pacific region.

Group F 
Comprises teams in the Coffee Zone.

Phase II

Bracket

Round of 16 
The round of 16 will be a 2-legged playoff in which the team winning in aggregate score will advance to the quarterfinals. In such a case of a series being tied in the aggregate score, a penalty shoot-out will be used, and neither the away goals rule nor extra time will be applied. Team 1 plays the second leg at home. The first legs were played between July 13 and July 16, and return legs were played on July 20 and July 21.

Quarterfinals 
The quarterfinals will again be a 2-legged elimination series in which the winners of the Round of 16 were paired up and drawn into fixtures. The teams that win in aggregate score will advance to the semifinals. In case of a tie at the end of the second leg, the away goals rule will not come into effect and the series will go directly to a penalty shoot-out. The first legs will be played on August 31 and the return legs will be played on September 7.

Semifinals 
The semifinals will again be a 2-legged elimination series in which the winners of the Quarterfinals were paired up and drawn into fixtures. The team that wins in aggregate score will advance to the final. In case of a tie at the end of the second leg, the away goals rule will not come into effect and the series will go directly to a penalty shoot-out. The first legs will be played on October 5 and the return legs will be played on October 12.

Final 
The final will be a 2-legged series. In case of a tie at the end of the second leg, the away goals rule will not come into effect and the series will go directly to a penalty shoot-out. The first leg will be played on October 19 and the return leg will be played on October 27.

Top goalscorers

References

External links 
 Copa Postobón
 Copa Colombia 2011, soccerway.com

Copa Colombia seasons
Colombia
Copa Colombia